Beauchief railway station (pronounced Beechif) was in Sheffield, South Yorkshire, England.

It was built by the Midland Railway in 1870 and was designed by the company architect John Holloway Sanders.

The station served the communities of Beauchief, Woodseats and Ecclesall and was situated on the Midland Main Line between Millhouses railway station and Dore & Totley station, near Abbeydale Road South in Abbeydale. The station was originally called Abbey Houses and later Beauchief & Abbey Dale station.

The station was opened on the site of Hutcliffe Mill at the same time as the main line from Chesterfield. At opening it had two platforms, but this was increased to four with the widening which took place between 1901 and 1903. It closed on 1 January 1961. The stationmasters house survives as a private residence and the nearby Abbeydale Station Hotel was renamed the Beauchief Hotel. In 2018 the hotel site was redeveloped as luxury apartments.

References

External links
 Beauchief station on navigable O.S. map

Disused railway stations in Sheffield
Railway stations in Great Britain opened in 1870
Railway stations in Great Britain closed in 1961
Former Midland Railway stations
John Holloway Sanders railway stations